USS Jallao (SS-368), a  submarine, was a ship of the United States Navy named for the jallao, a pearl-white haemulonid food fish of the Gulf of Mexico.

Construction and commissioning
Jallao was launched by the Manitowoc Shipbuilding Company at Manitowoc, Wisconsin, on 12 March 1944, sponsored by Mrs. Oliver G. Kirk, and commissioned on 8 July 1944.

Operational history
After spending most of July in training operations, Jallao departed Manitowoc 26 July for Chicago, where she was loaded into a floating dry dock for the long trip down the Mississippi to New Orleans. She subsequently departed New Orleans 6 August 1944, and steamed through the Panama Canal to the Pacific and arrived Pearl Harbor 22 September 1944.

First patrol, October – December 1944 

At first the submarines proceeded toward Luzon Strait; but, during the Battle of Leyte Gulf late in October, they were directed to take up scouting positions between the Philippines and Japan to cut off Japanese cripples struggling home after their devastating defeat at the Battle off Cape Engaño.

On the evening of 25 October Jallao picked up damaged light cruiser  on radar and moved to attack. She fired seven torpedoes; three hit the Japanese warship, sinking it. Future United States federal judge Jack B. Weinstein was in charge of the submarine's radar when the submarine located the cruiser.

After this notable success on her maiden patrol, Jallao continued her search until 28 November, returning to Majuro 10 December.

Second, third, and fourth patrols, January – September 1945 

Jallao sailed for the Yellow Sea for her second war patrol 6 January 1945. The decimated Japanese merchant marine offered few targets. However, she flushed a convoy 5 March. During the attack, she had a close call when an enemy escort trying to ram her damaged her periscope. Two days later she sailed for Midway, arriving 26 March.

After repairs, the submarine departed Midway 20 April 1945 for her third war patrol and was assigned aircraft lifeguard duty off Marcus Island. Responding to reports of flyers in the water north of the island 9 May, Jallao braved shore batteries to move in and pick up five men in a raft, delivering them safely to Saipan 12 May 1945. She then departed for the coast of Japan and more lifeguard duty as American heavy bombers stepped up their attacks on the home islands. She arrived Pearl Harbor 13 June 1945.

After advanced training in the Marianas, Jallao departed Guam 31 July to patrol the Sea of Japan. On this, her fourth and final patrol, the submarine sank 6,000-ton freighter Timoko Maru  11 August 1945 (19 survivors were found by  21 August 1945). Four days later hostilities ended; and the ship sailed via Guam to San Francisco, where she arrived 28 September 1945. She was decommissioned at Mare Island 30 September 1946, and entered the Pacific Reserve Fleet.

1953–1956 

Jallaos home port was changed to New London in July 1953, for a GUPPY IIA conversion in which she was streamlined and equipped with snorkeling gear and new electric equipment. She recommissioned 4 December 1953. After shakedown in the San Diego area, the submarine departed 12 April for the East Coast, steaming via the Panama Canal to Norfolk, Virginia

Joining Submarine Squadron 6, Jallao operated out of Halifax, Nova Scotia during 1954, training with Canadian and American antisubmarine units. In January and February 1955, she took part in fleet exercises in the Caribbean, returning to Norfolk 4 March.

Jallaos home port was changed to New London in July 1955 and she got underway with British submarine  7 August to take part in Joint Exercise "New Broom IV". Following this operation, Jallao was deployed to the 6th Fleet and departed for the Mediterranean 9 November 1955. In the months that followed, she helped train Italian Navy ships and took part in fleet exercises, beginning the long voyage home in mid-January 1956. The ship steamed through the Suez Canal, visited several countries of eastern and southern Africa, and crossed the South Atlantic to take part in exercises with Uruguayan and Brazilian destroyers. The veteran submarine returned to New London 16 April.

1957–1967 

After having installed the latest in electronic gear, Jallao resumed operations in January 1957. Combined fleet exercises in the Caribbean occupied her through February; and, after coastal antisubmarine operations, she arrived Boston late in July for a short midshipman training cruise. September and October were spent in the North Atlantic on a NATO exercise as the submarine helped strengthen the armed forces of the Atlantic Allies. She returned to New London 24 October 1957.

Jallao spent most of 1958 on training exercises off the Atlantic Coast, taking part in a combined antisubmarine exercise in the North Atlantic in September. The year 1959 was spent largely in equipment development work and training with the Submarine School at New London.

The ship got underway 20 January 1960 for exercises in the Caribbean, returning 19 February. The latter part of the year was spent in training out of Bermuda. From 9 January to 24 March 1961, the veteran submarine carried out special training operations off Scotland, and operated with Canadian ships off Halifax during that summer. The remainder of the year was spent in the New London area.

Jallao began 1962 with her second Mediterranean cruise, sailing 2 January and exercising with the vital 6th Fleet in the troubled area until 7 May. The last 4 months of the year were spent in extensive modernization and repairs at Philadelphia Naval Shipyard. Through 1963 and 1964, the boat took part in training cruises to the Caribbean, served in submarine school training, and participated in equipment evaluation work.

On 3 January 1965, she departed for a four-month 6th Fleet deployment. She returned 1 May for submarine warfare tactics and submarine school operations out of New London. Jallao operated along the Atlantic coast and in the Caribbean until 1974.

Narciso Monturiol (S-35) 

On 26 June 1974, Jallao was decommissioned, struck from the US Naval Register, and transferred (sold) under the terms of the Security Assistance Program, to Spain. The submarine was commissioned into the Spanish Navy as  Narciso Monturiol (S-35), named after Narcís Monturiol.

Monturiol was decommissioned on 12 December 1984 and scuttled off Cartagena, Spain, in 1985.

Awards 
Jallao received four battle stars for World War II service.

See also 
 List of submarines of the Spanish Navy

References

External links 

website for USS Jallao
website for  Narciso Monturiol
   Kill record: USS Jallao

 
 

Ships built in Manitowoc, Wisconsin
1944 ships
Balao-class submarines
World War II submarines of the United States
Cold War submarines of the United States
Balao-class submarines of the Spanish Navy
Shipwrecks in the Mediterranean Sea
Shipwrecks of Spain
Maritime incidents in 1985